In public policy, outrage factor is public opposition to a policy that is not based on the knowledge of the technical details. The term "outrage factor" originates from Peter Sandman's 1993 book, Responding to Community Outrage: Strategies for Effective Risk Communication.

Causes 
"Outrage factors" are the emotional factors that influence perception of risk. The risks that are considered involuntary, industrial and unfair are often given more weight than factors that are thought of as voluntary, natural and fair.

Sandman gives the formula:
The following are listed in Covello and Sandman's 2001 article, Risk Communication: Evolution and Revolution

Risk communications 
While policy analysis by institutional stakeholders typically focuses on risk-benefit analysis and cost-benefit analysis, popular risk perception is not informed by the same concerns. The successful implementation of a policy relying on public support and cooperation must address the outrage factor when informing the public about the policy.

In an interview with New York Times journalist and Freakonomics author Stephen J. Dubner, Sandman emphasized "the most important truth in risk communication is the exceedingly low correlation between whether a risk is dangerous, and whether it's upsetting".

The relevance of public outrage has been acknowledged in discussions of various policy debates, including

 nuclear safety.
 terrorism.
 public health.
 environmental management.

See also
 Cultural theory of risk
 Risk aversion
 Risk perception
 Worry

References

Bibliography
 

Public policy
Risk management
Political communication